Pat Darling (31 August 1913 in Casino, New South Wales, Australia – 2007) was an Australian servicewoman and nursing sister with the 2/10th Australian General Hospital.

Early life
Born as Janet Patteson Gunther, her great grandfather, Archdeacon James Gunther, was a missionary to indigenous Australians at Wellington, New South Wales. Her grandfather, Archdeacon William Gunther, was rector of St John's, Parramatta. The second eldest of eight children, she attended bush schools before leaving school at 12 to help out at home in the farm.

World War II
She trained in general nursing at Royal Prince Alfred Hospital in Camperdown, and worked as a private nurse until enlisting in 1940 with the 2nd/10th Australian General Hospital. She sailed to Singapore in February 1941. She was one of the Australian nurses taken prisoner by the Japanese in Sumatra during World War II. She wrote about her three and a half years incarceration and survival in Portrait of a Nurse (published in 2001).

Family
She married Major George Colin Darling (NX101315 2/5 Infantry Battalion), a manager with the Port Kembla steelworks in 1957 and a widower with four children in 1949. She stopped nursing in the late 1940s/early 1950s. Colin Darling died in the early 1970s.

Death
Darling died in 2007, aged 94. Her husband George Colin Darling died in 1983, aged 76.

See also
 Vivian Bullwinkel

References

External links
Women of Australia website
Australian Nurses Memorial website
Donwall Books website
 note: same link as "^ POWs of Japan above under References

1913 births
2007 deaths
Australian nurses
Australian prisoners of war
People from New South Wales
Women in the Australian military
Women in World War II
World War II prisoners of war held by Japan
Place of death missing
Australian women nurses